Sverdrup Pass is a mountain pass in central Ellesmere Island, Nunavut, Canada.

On 27 May 2013, researchers from the University of Alberta found samples of 400-year-old bryophytes that were still alive and viable. The specimens were found in an area vacated by the retreating Teardrop Glacier, near Sverdrup Pass. The bryophytes had most likely been buried under ice during the Little Ice Age.

References

Arctic Cordillera
Mountain passes of Qikiqtaaluk Region
Ellesmere Island